Songs of the Unsung is a solo album by American jazz pianist/composer Horace Tapscott recorded in 1978 and released on the Interplay label.

Reception

AllMusic awarded the album 4 stars with its review by Scott Yanow calling it "A fine outing that, if it were in-print, could serve as a fairly accessible introduction to the masterful pianist".

Track listing
All compositions by Horace Tapscott except as indicated
 "Song of the Unsung" - 3:39  
 "Blue Essence" (Samuel R. Browne) - 3:51  
 "Bakai" (Cal Massey) - 5:55  
 "In Times Like These" (Lester Robinson) - 7:01  
 "Mary on Sunday" - 3:22  
 "Lush Life" (Billy Strayhorn) - 6:34  
 "The Goat and Ram Jam" (Jesse Sharps) - 5:01  
 "Something for Kenny" (Elmo Hope) - 5:58

Personnel
Horace Tapscott - piano

References

Horace Tapscott albums
1978 albums
Interplay Records albums
Solo piano jazz albums